Greg Slough (born February 26, 1948) is a former American football linebacker. He played for the Oakland Raiders from 1971 to 1972.

References

1948 births
Living people
American football linebackers
USC Trojans football players
Oakland Raiders players